Thomas Sayer (b London 6 July 1651 - d Winchester 3 June 1710) was an Anglican priest in the late 17th and early 18th centuries.

Sayer was  educated at Merchant Taylors' School and St John's College, Oxford, graduating BA in 1673.  Sayer was Chaplain to Peter Mews, Bishop of Winchester then Archdeacon of Surrey from 1689 until his death.

References

1710 deaths
Alumni of St John's College, Oxford
Archdeacons of Surrey
People from the City of London
17th-century English Anglican priests
People educated at Merchant Taylors' School, Northwood
1651 births
18th-century English Anglican priests